On with the Show is the third studio album by British dance band Alex Mendham and His Orchestra, released in July 2017.

Track listing

References

External links
 http://www.alexmendham.com

2017 albums